Catherine, Princess of Wales  (born Catherine Elizabeth Middleton; 9 January 1982) is a member of the British royal family. She is married to William, Prince of Wales, the heir apparent to the British throne, making her likely the next queen consort.

Born in Reading, Catherine grew up in Bucklebury, Berkshire. She was educated at St Andrew's School and Marlborough College before studying art history at the University of St Andrews in Scotland, where she met Prince William in 2001. She held several jobs in retail and marketing and pursued charity work before their engagement was announced in November 2010. They married on 29 April 2011 at Westminster Abbey. The couple's three children together— Prince George,  Princess Charlotte, and Prince Louis—are second, third, and fourth respectively in the line of succession to the British throne.

Catherine holds patronage with over 20 charitable and military organisations, including Action for Children, SportsAid, and the National Portrait Gallery. She undertakes projects through The Royal Foundation, with her charity work focusing on issues surrounding early childhood care, addiction, and art. To encourage people to open up about their mental health issues, Catherine envisioned the mental health awareness campaign "Heads Together", launched with her husband Prince William and brother-in-law Prince Harry in April 2016. The media have called Catherine's impact on British and American fashion the "Kate Middleton effect".  Time magazine listed her as one of the 100 Most Influential People in the World thrice in 2011, 2012 and 2013 respectively and as a finalist in 2018. On 9 September 2022, she became Princess of Wales when her husband was created Prince of Wales by his father, King Charles III.

Early life and career
Catherine Elizabeth Middleton was born on 9 January 1982 at the Royal Berkshire Hospital in Reading into an upper-middle-class family. She was baptised at St Andrew's Bradfield, a local parish church, on 20 June 1982. She is the eldest of three children born to Michael Middleton (b. 1949) and his wife, Carole (née Goldsmith; b. 1955), a former flight dispatcher and flight attendant at British Airways, respectively, who in 1987 founded Party Pieces, a privately held mail order company that sells party supplies and decorations with an estimated worth of £30 million. By the early 20th century, the Middleton family had married into the  British aristocracy and benefited financially from trust funds which they established over 100 years ago. Her Middleton relatives, including her great-grandfather Richard Noël Middleton and his wife Olive, played host to members of the British royal family in the 1920s through to the 1940s. Her mother's family are descended from coal miners, and have been described as working-class. She has a younger sister, Philippa, and a younger brother, James.

The family moved from Bradfield Southend, Berkshire, to Amman, Jordan, in May 1984, where her father worked for British Airways. Middleton attended an English-language nursery school. When her family returned to Berkshire in September 1986, she was enrolled aged four at St Andrew's School, a private school near Pangbourne in Berkshire. She boarded part-weekly at St Andrew's in her later years. In 1995, the Middletons moved to the village of Bucklebury. She studied at Downe House School. She was a boarder at Marlborough College, a co-educational independent boarding school in Wiltshire; Middleton showed talent in sports and was captain of the women's field hockey team. While at Marlborough, she underwent an operation on the left side of her head, reportedly to remove a lump. She obtained three A-Levels in 2000, with an 'A' in mathematics, an 'A' in art, and a 'B' in English. Despite being offered a seat at the University of Edinburgh, she took a gap year, studying at the British Institute of Florence in Italy and travelling to Chile to participate in a Raleigh International programme. She worked as a deckhand at the Port of Southampton in the summer preceding university. Middleton subsequently enrolled at University of St Andrews in Fife, Scotland, studying history of art. She briefly studied psychology before focusing solely on art history. She worked part-time as a waitress during her studies. While attending university, she achieved a gold Duke of Edinburgh Award. Middleton was an active member of The Lumsden Club, which held fundraisers and community projects each year. In 2005, Middleton graduated from the  University of St Andrews with an undergraduate MA (2:1 Hons) in the history of art.

In November 2006, Middleton commenced part-time work for twelve months as an accessory buyer with the clothing chain Jigsaw. In 2007, she curated a photography exhibition to mark the book launch of "Time to Reflect", by Alistair Morrison, to raise funds for UNICEF. In 2008, Middleton made several trips to Naomi's House Hospice, where she brought gifts and read to children. Later that year, she organised an '80s-themed roller disco fundraiser which raised £100,000, split between Oxford Children's Hospital, for the construction of Tom's Ward to treat pediatric cancer, and Place2Be, an organisation which provides mental health counselling to school children. Middleton also worked until January 2011 at the family business in catalogue design and production, marketing, and photography. While working for the company, she launched the firm's junior brand for toddlers, and began working with the Starlight Children's Foundation, which helps terminally ill youth, providing party essentials for sick children. Middleton also helped coordinate the Boodles Boxing Ball, which raised money for the charity.

Prior to her marriage, Middleton lived in an apartment owned by her parents in Chelsea, London alongside her sister, which was estimated to be worth £1–1.4 million. In 2018, Catherine's total net worth was estimated at £5–7.3 million, most of which is from her parents' company.

Personal life

Pre-wedding relationship with Prince William

In 2001, Middleton met Prince William while they were students in residence at St Salvator's Hall at the University of St Andrews. She reportedly caught William's eye at a charity fashion show at the university in 2002 when she appeared on the stage wearing a see-through lace dress. The couple reportedly began dating in 2003. During their second year, Middleton shared a flat with William and two other friends. From 2003 to 2005, they both resided at Balgove House on the Strathtyrum estate with two roommates. In 2004, the couple briefly split but continued their relationship soon afterwards.

After her graduation, Middleton and her family were faced with intensive tabloid press scrutiny. She was often photographed daily by the paparazzi outside her flat and work over the course of their relationship. This prompted multiple warnings from the Palace and Middleton's lawyers. She attended William's Passing Out Parade at the Royal Military Academy Sandhurst on 15 December 2006.  In April 2007, they ended their relationship. She and her family attended the Concert for Diana in July 2007, where she and William sat two rows apart. It was subsequently reported that the couple had reconciled. On 17 May 2008, Middleton attended the wedding of William's cousin Peter Phillips to Autumn Kelly in William's stead, and met Queen Elizabeth II for the first time.

Middleton attended the Order of the Garter procession at Windsor Castle in June 2008, where  William was made a Royal Knight of the Garter. On 19 July 2008, she was a guest at the wedding of Lady Rose Windsor and George Gilman. William was away on military operations in the Caribbean, serving aboard HMS Iron Duke. In June 2010, the couple moved into a cottage on the Bodorgan Estate in Anglesey, Wales, where William resided during his RAF search-and-rescue training and subsequent career.

Marriage and children

Middleton and Prince William became engaged in October 2010, in Kenya, during a 10-day trip to the Lewa Wildlife Conservancy to celebrate William passing the RAF helicopter search and rescue course. Clarence House announced the engagement on 16 November 2010. William gave Middleton the engagement ring that had belonged to his mother, Diana, Princess of Wales. Middleton, who was christened as a child, decided to be confirmed into the Church of England preceding her wedding. The confirmation service was conducted on 10 March at St James's Palace by the Bishop of London with her family and William in attendance.

The couple married in Westminster Abbey on 29 April 2011 (St. Catherine's Day), with the day declared a bank holiday in the United Kingdom. Estimates of the global audience for the wedding ranged around 300 million or more, whilst 26 million watched the event live in Britain alone. Her wedding dress was designed by Sarah Burton at Alexander McQueen. Upon her marriage, Catherine assumed the style "Her Royal Highness The Duchess of Cambridge". The couple were given the country home, Anmer Hall, on the Sandringham Estate, as a wedding gift from the Queen. Catherine keeps bees on the grounds of Anmer Hall. Following their marriage in 2011, the couple used Nottingham Cottage as their London residence. They moved into the four-storey, 20-room Apartment 1A at Kensington Palace in 2013. Renovations took 18 months at a cost of £4.5 million. Kensington Palace became William and Catherine's main residence in 2017, moving from their country home, Anmer Hall. In 2022, it was announced that the couple, along with their children, would move to Adelaide Cottage in Windsor. They officially moved into the house in September 2022.

On 3 December 2012, St James's Palace announced that Catherine was pregnant with her first child. The announcement was made earlier in the pregnancy than is usual as she had been admitted to King Edward VII's Hospital suffering from hyperemesis gravidarum, a severe form of morning sickness. She remained in hospital for three days. Prince George was born at St Mary's Hospital in London on 22 July 2013. The severe morning sickness returned with the subsequent pregnancies, forcing Catherine to cancel her official engagements. She gave birth to Princess Charlotte on 2 May 2015 and to Prince Louis on 23 April 2018. Prince George was third in the line of succession to the British throne, while Princess Charlotte and Prince Louis were fourth and fifth, respectively, at the times of their births. William and Catherine have owned two English Cocker Spaniels, named Lupo and Orla.

Public life

Middleton's first public appearance with Prince William following their engagement was at a fundraising event organised by the Teenage Cancer Trust in December 2010. She was formally introduced to public life on 24 February 2011, when the couple attended a lifeboat-naming ceremony in Trearddur, near their home at the time in Anglesey, North Wales. A day later they appeared in St Andrews to launch the university's 600th anniversary celebrations. In March 2011, the couple toured Belfast. Catherine's first official engagement after the wedding came in May, when she and William met U.S President Barack Obama and First Lady Michelle Obama at Buckingham Palace. William and Catherine's first royal tour of Canada took place in July 2011. The couple's activities included attending celebrations for Canada Day. The tour also included a two-day trip to California which was also Catherine's first visit to the United States.  On 27 October 2011, she undertook her first solo engagement at a reception for In Kind Direct, hosted at Clarence House, stepping in for her  the then Prince Charles. 

On 2 November, Catherine and William visited the UNICEF Supply Division for malnourished children in Copenhagen, Denmark. On St. Patrick's Day in 2012, Catherine carried out the traditional awarding of shamrocks to the Irish Guards at their Aldershot base; this was her first solo military engagement. On 19 March, she gave her first public speech for the opening of a children's hospice opened by her patronage, East Anglia's Children's Hospices. William and Catherine were announced as ambassadors for the 2012 Summer Olympics in London. As part of her role, Catherine attended numerous sporting events throughout the games. In September 2012, the couple embarked on a tour of Singapore, Malaysia, Tuvalu, and the Solomon Islands to commemorate the Queen's Diamond Jubilee across the Commonwealth. During this overseas visit, she made her first official speech abroad, while visiting a hospice in Malaysia, drawing on her experience as patron of East Anglia's Children's Hospices. The couple attended further celebrations of the Jubilee throughout the year, including the Thames Diamond Jubilee Pageant in July.

The first engagement that Catherine carried out after the birth of Prince George was in late August 2013, when she accompanied her husband to meet runners preparing for an ultra-marathon in Anglesey. At the beginning of March 2014, it was announced that the couple would be accompanied by their son on an upcoming tour of New Zealand and Australia from 16 to 25 April. The tour was Catherine's first visit to the area and Prince George's first major public appearance since his christening in October 2013. The tour itinerary included visiting the Plunket Society for children and visiting fire-damaged areas in New South Wales. In June 2014, the couple visited France to attend the commemoration of the 70th anniversary of the Normandy landings at Gold Beach. On 21 July 2014, it was announced that Catherine would be making her first solo trip, visiting the island of Malta on 20–21 September 2014, when the island was celebrating its 50th independence anniversary. Her trip was cancelled, with her husband taking her place, after the announcement of her second pregnancy in early September. In December 2014, the couple visited the United States and attended a charity dinner at the Metropolitan Museum of Art.

In October 2015, she attended her first state banquet at Buckingham Palace, held to host Chinese President Xi Jinping. In April 2016, Catherine and William undertook a tour to India and Bhutan. Activities included visiting children's charities such as Childline India, as well as a visit to Lingkana Palace. Later that month, the couple met again with the Obamas at Kensington Palace. The couple toured Canada again in September 2016. On 11 October 2016, Catherine made her first solo foreign trip to The Netherlands. Countries visited by the couple in 2017 include France, Poland, Germany, and Belgium. Catherine takes official portraits of her children and joined the Royal Photographic Society in 2017. She visited Luxembourg City in May 2017 for the Treaty of London commemorations. In January 2018, the couple visited Sweden and Norway. In February 2019, William and Catherine carried out a two-day visit of Northern Ireland, visiting Belfast, Fermanagh, and Ballymena.

In June 2019, Catherine took the royal first salute, typically received by the Queen, at the Beating Retreat military pageant. Catherine accompanied her husband on a tour of Pakistan in October 2019, the royal family's first visit to the country in 13 years. The couple conducted an interview for CNN in Lahore while visiting the SoS Children's Village, where Catherine gave a speech relating to her work on the early years. In March 2020, the couple carried out a three-day tour of Ireland, visiting County Meath, Kildare, and Galway. In October 2020, William and Catherine met President Volodymyr Zelensky of Ukraine and First Lady Olena Zelenska at Buckingham Palace, the first royal engagement held at the residence since the start of the COVID-19 pandemic. In December, the couple embarked on a three-day tour of England, Scotland, and Wales via the British Royal Train "to pay tribute to the inspiring work of individuals, organisations and initiatives across the country " in 2020. Prime Minister Boris Johnson expressed his support for the initiative, while First Minister of Scotland Nicola Sturgeon criticised the tour, citing travel restrictions; UK, Scottish and Welsh governments were consulted before planning the tour. In May 2021, the couple returned to Scotland for an extensive tour of Edinburgh, Fife and Orkney. In Cornwall on 11 June 2021, William and Catherine attended the G7 summit for the first time. Catherine visited primary students alongside US First Lady Jill Biden and participated in a roundtable discussion focusing on early childhood education.

In February 2022, she visited Denmark to celebrate historic ties between the UK and Denmark and also to celebrate milestones of both countries' monarchs. In March 2022, William and Catherine embarked on a tour of Belize, The Bahamas and Jamaica to commemorate the Queen's Platinum Jubilee. On 27 September 2022, Catherine and William visited Anglesey and Swansea, which marked their first visit to Wales since becoming the Princess and Prince of Wales. In November 2022, they welcomed President of South Africa Cyril Ramaphosa and attended a state dinner in honour of his visit.

Charity work

Patronages and interests
Following her marriage, Catherine assumed royal duties and commitments in support of the Queen. In March 2011, William and Catherine set up a gift fund held by The Foundation of Prince William and Prince Harry to allow well-wishers who wanted to give them a wedding gift to donate money to charities they care about instead. The gift fund supported 26 charities of the couple's choice, incorporating the armed forces, children, the elderly, art, sport and conservation. In June 2012, The Foundation of Prince William and Prince Harry was renamed The Royal Foundation of The Duke and Duchess of Cambridge and Prince Harry, to reflect Catherine's contribution to the charity. The charity is now listed as The Royal Foundation of The Prince and Princess of Wales.

Catherine's charity work focuses mainly on issues surrounding young children, mental health, sport, addiction, and art. Her impact on charitable donations and project visibility has been called the "Kate effect". She has a number of charitable patronages: Action for Children, the All England Lawn Tennis and Croquet Club, the Anna Freud Centre, East Anglia's Children's Hospices (EACH), Evelina London Children's Hospital, Family Action, the Maternal Mental Health Alliance, the National Portrait Gallery, the Natural History Museum, NHS Charities Together, Place2Be, the Royal College of Obstetricians and Gynaecologists, SportsAid, the 1851 Trust, the Foundling Museum, the Lawn Tennis Association, the Royal Photographic Society, and the Victoria and Albert Museum. Catherine, as a history of art graduate, takes an interest in art and handpicked the Art Room, which helped disadvantaged children access art therapy before their closure, as well as the National Portrait Gallery. She acquired patronage of the Lawn Tennis Association, the All England Lawn Tennis and Croquet Club, Action for Children, and the Royal Photographic Society after they were passed down by the Queen. In December 2015, she assumed the patronage of the Royal Air Force Air Cadets for youths 12–19 years of age. The Duke of Edinburgh, who had been patron of the RAF Cadets for 63 years, formally handed over during an audience at Buckingham Palace. She became a patron of the Foundling Museum, a museum to commemorate Foundling Hospital, in 2019. Catherine was also a local volunteer leader with The Scout Association in north Wales, of which Queen Elizabeth II was patron, before being made co-president in September 2020, alongside the Duke of Kent.

In her capacity as patron of Action on Addiction, she has occasionally made visits to its centres, spending time with recovering addicts. In October 2012, she, alongside Action on Addiction, launched the M-PACT programme (Moving Parents and Children Together), one of the only UK programmes to focus specifically on the impact of drug addiction on families. 283 Place2Be volunteers were trained through the programme to reach over 26,000 children. On 24 June 2021, Catherine was announced as the patron of The Forward Trust after Action on Addiction was merged with it. As a patron of The Forward Trust, she launched a campaign titled "Taking Action on Addiction". Catherine has worked extensively in children's palliative care alongside East Anglia's Children's Hospices and undertakes private visits to children's hospices and their families. She made her first public address at the opening of their Ipswich facility in 2012, which EACH deputy director Tracy Rennie cites as creating a "global interest" in children's hospices. Catherine officially opened their Norfolk hospice in 2019, after previously launching their financial appeal in 2014, which raised £10m. She has carried out engagements to raise awareness of Children's Hospice Week since 2013.

Catherine is a keen sportswoman and attends Wimbledon annually, as patron of the All England Lawn Tennis and Croquet Club of which she has been a patron since 2016. Catherine, who enjoys sailing, has occasionally taken part in the sport to raise money for charity. In 2012, together with her husband and Prince Harry, Catherine launched Coach Core. The programme was set up following the 2012 Olympics and provides apprenticeship opportunities for people who desire to pursue a career as a professional coach. As of 2018, Coach Core has had over 400 apprentices and graduates across 10 locations. In 2014 she and William were awarded Honorary Life Membership of the Marylebone Cricket Club. In July 2019, she lent her support to Backyard Nature, a campaign created to inspire "children, families and communities to get outside and engage with nature". In August 2019, the couple competed in the King's Cup yachting regatta to raise money for eight different charities. In February 2022, she became the patron of both the Rugby Football Union and the Rugby Football League, both governing bodies that were previously supported by her brother-in-law the Duke of Sussex. In August 2022, it was announced that Catherine and Roger Federer would attend the Laver Cup Open Practice Day on 22 September, which Catherine had to pull out from due to the mourning period following the death of Queen Elizabeth II, but the proceeds from the event were donated to her patronages Action for Children and the Lawn Tennis Association.

In 2014, Catherine wrote the foreword for Living in the Slipstream: Life as an RAF Wife, whose proceeds raised money for charity. Since acquiring patronage of the RAF Cadets, she has made visits to their base in Cambridgeshire and celebrated their 75th anniversary in 2016.  In January 2018, locks of her hair were reportedly donated to the Little Princess Trust, a charity which makes wigs for children diagnosed with cancer. In February 2018, she became the patron of the Royal College of Obstetricians and Gynaecologists. She also launched Nursing Now, a three-year worldwide campaign to raise awareness about the profile of nurses. She has written of  her family ties with nursing and that both her grandmother Valerie Middleton and her great-grandmother Olive Middleton were VAD nurses for the British Red Cross. During the COVID-19 pandemic, Catherine undertook many in-person and virtual engagements supporting National Health Service workers. She discreetly volunteered with the Royal Voluntary Service during the COVID-19 pandemic.

Catherine has called herself an "enthusiastic amateur photographer" and has taken official portraits of her children, as well as other members of the royal family. In 2019, she supported workshops run by the Royal Photographic Society in partnership with Action for Children to highlight the effect of photography in expressing thoughts in young people. As patron of the Royal Photographic Society she and other photographers took part in an exhibition to mark the 75th anniversary of the end of the Holocaust. Photos taken by Catherine of the Holocaust survivors were later included in an exhibition at the Imperial War Museum. With the National Portrait Gallery, Catherine curated an exhibition of Victorian photography, with a thematic focus on childhood. In May 2020, she launched "Hold Still", a project to capture people's life during lockdown, which garnered 31,000 submissions. In July 2020, the exhibition was released, with the final 100 photographs being displayed online. In October 2020, the portraits were displayed on 112 public sites, including billboards, murals, and posters, across 80 towns and cities. The online exhibition collected over 5.2 million page views. The photographs were published in a book on 7 May 2021, titled Hold Still: A Portrait of Our Nation in 2020, with a foreword written by Catherine.

In May 2021, Catherine received her first dose of COVID-19 vaccine by NHS staff at the Science Museum in London, encouraging use of the vaccine and thanking the staff for "playing a part in the rollout". In October 2022, Catherine became patron to Preet Chandi, a British Army medical officer who aimed to complete a 1,000-mile solo expedition in the South Pole after finishing a 700-mile journey in the continent earlier that year.

Catherine hosted a Christmas carol concert called "Together At Christmas" at Westminster Abbey in December 2021, honouring charities and individuals that served the communities during the COVID-19 pandemic. The concert was produced by Westminster Abbey and BBC Studios Events Productions and broadcast by ITV. She played the piano during a performance of "For Those Who Can't Be Here" by Tom Walker. She hosted a second Christmas carol service at the abbey in December 2022 to honour the "efforts of individuals, families and communities across the UK," and pay tribute to Queen Elizabeth II.

In March 2022 and amid the Russian invasion of Ukraine, Catherine and William made a donation to help the refugees. In February 2023, they donated to the Disasters Emergency Committee (DEC) which was helping victims of the 2023 Turkey–Syria earthquake.

Mental health advocacy
Catherine has tackled issues surrounding mental health and disabilities. She has previously made visits to charities and hospitals such as St Thomas' Hospital and Maurice Wohl Clinical Neuroscience Institute to spend time with mothers and children who deal with these issues.  Catherine has been credited with raising national awareness of children's mental health; Benita Refson, president of Place2Be, has praised her work, saying she would "shine the spotlight on child mental health", while Peter Fonagy, CEO of the Anna Freud Centre has called her one of the most important figures in the field, and stated that "to the millions of children who have been suffering in silence, she is their voice". In recognition of their work with charities concerned with children's mental health, Catherine and her husband were awarded the Gold Blue Peter badge, an award previously granted to the Queen. To encourage people to open up about their mental health issues, Catherine, William and Prince Harry initiated the mental health awareness campaign "Heads Together" in April 2016. The campaign was first envisioned by Catherine earlier that year. "Heads Together" reportedly resulted in over one million people speaking out about their mental health, and an investment of £3m in mental health innovations. She later voluntarily talked about her struggles as a mother, and admitted that she suffered a "lack of confidence" and "feelings of ignorance" during certain periods of time.

Catherine has discussed her experiences with "mum guilt" in balancing work/life commitments, and described bringing her newborn home from the hospital for the first time as "terrifying". She has also highlighted the importance of "a happy home" and "a safe environment" for children, and described her "passion" for the outdoors, referencing it as an asset to building childhood wellbeing and developmental foundations. She launched the Mentally Healthy Schools, which helps the students and staff with access "to reliable and practical resources to improve awareness, knowledge and confidence in supporting pupils' mental health". Catherine held sessions for the programme at the Mental Health in Education Conference in 2019. After two years of development, the website had over 250,000 visitors to the site accessing resources. In February 2016, she travelled to Edinburgh to promote the work of Place2Be, and launched Children's Mental Health Week, which she commemorates annually. Catherine guest-edited HuffPost UK as a part of the Young Minds Matter movement, an effort "to raise awareness for children's mental health issues".

In 2019, Catherine worked with the Royal Horticultural Society as one of the co-designers for a garden display at the 2019 Chelsea Flower Show. She designed the "Back to Nature Garden" together with Andree Davies and Adam White. The garden, which featured "a tree house, waterfall, rustic den and a campfire" among other parts, was unveiled at the Chelsea Flower Show in May 2019 to emphasise "the benefits the natural world brings to mental and physical well-being". The garden was later expanded and moved to Hampton Court Palace as a part of the Hampton Court Palace Flower Show, before being shown at the Back to Nature Festival at RHS Garden Wisley. A playground, inspired by the "Back to Nature" garden, was built on the Sandringham Estate in 2021. In May 2019, as a part of their "Heads Together" initiative, Catherine together with her husband and in-laws, launched Shout, a text messaging service for those who have mental issues. As of November 2020, the programme has facilitated over half a million conversations. In October 2019, Catherine, together with other members of the royal family, voiced a PSA video for Public Health England "as part of its Every Mind Matters program". In late March 2020, Catherine and her husband started supporting a new mental health initiative by the Public Health England amidst the COVID-19 pandemic in the United Kingdom. In April 2020, Catherine and her husband announced Our Frontline, an initiative providing mental health support to emergency medical workers. In May 2020, the couple's recorded radio message for Mental Health Awareness Week was broadcast across all the stations in the UK. In June 2020, Catherine hosted an assembly to 80 elementary school students across the UK where she discussed the importance of self-care and "opening up about your feelings". She led the assembly over a Zoom call and the assembly will be broadcast to more students who use Oak National Academy, an online education resource hub.

In February 2021, Catherine recorded a video message about the importance of positive mental health during the pandemic. The video has been watched by over 3.5 million people. In May 2021, William and Catherine, with other prominent personalities, voiced 2021 Mental Health Minute, a one-minute record delivered by Radiocentre and Somethin' Else to mark 2021 Mental Health Awareness Week. The record was broadcast across all radio stations in the UK and reached over 20 million listeners. In May 2022, the couple voiced the Mental Health Minute message again, which was broadcast on every radio station in the UK on 13 May and asked people to help individuals around them that suffer from loneliness.

In February 2022, she made a surprise appearance in CBeebies Bedtime Stories where she read The Owl Who Was Afraid of the Dark by Jill Tomlinson as the conclusion of Children's Mental Health Week. In October 2022, to mark World Mental Health Day, the couple took over Newsbeat and interviewed four guests on topics related to mental health.

Early years and childhood development 
Catherine initially became interested in how childhood affected conditions such as homelessness, mental health, and addiction during her early years of charity work. In March 2018, she hosted a symposium with the Royal Society of Medicine, focusing on children's health, and launched the Early Years Intervention Support initiative.  In May 2018, she established the Early Years Steering Group. In January 2020, Catherine launched "5 Big Questions on the Under 5's", a nationwide survey on development in early years. The survey was conducted by Ipsos MORI and contains "further qualitative and ethnographic research" on the early years. It received over 500,000 responses. The results of the survey were released in November 2020. The findings outlined five key topics surrounding early childhood, including parental mental health and wider community health and support. In July 2020, she supported and assisted in the development of BBC's "Tiny Happy People" initiative, providing free digital resources to parents with young children. In August 2020, she headed a donation drive to benefit baby banks nationwide, including Little Village, which spurred over 10,000 donations from Marks & Spencer, Tesco, John Lewis & Partners, and Sainsbury's. In June 2021, Catherine launched the Royal Foundation Centre for Early Childhood, which will conduct work, research, and campaigns with other organisations on issues surrounding the early years.

In February 2022, Catherine visited Denmark on behalf of the Royal Foundation Centre for Early Childhood. She visited University of Copenhagen and met officials from the Center for Early Intervention and Family Studies. She visited Stenurten Forest School, to learn about its approach to learning, which focuses on the students' social and emotional development rather than academic skills. She also visited Lego Foundation PlayLab at University College Copenhagen. In June 2022, Catherine hosted her first roundtable discussion with politicians on early childhood development.

In January 2023, Catherine launched the Shaping Us initiative via the Royal Foundation Centre for Early Childhood, a long-term campaign aimed at raising awareness about the importance of early childhood development.

Public image and style

The Princess, prominent for her fashion style, has been placed on numerous "best dressed" lists. The Daily Telegraph selected her as the "Most Promising Newcomer" on its 2006 list of style winners and losers. Tatler placed her at number eight on its yearly list of the top ten style icons in 2007. People featured her on its 2007 and 2010 best-dressed lists. She was named one of Richard Blackwell's ten Fabulous Fashion Independents of 2007. In June 2008, Style.com selected her as its monthly beauty icon. In July 2008, Vanity Fair included her on its international best-dressed list. In February 2011 the Global Language Monitor named her the Top Fashion buzzword of the 2011 season. In May 2011, she was ranked ninth in FHMs top 10 list of the "World's Most Beautiful Women". In 2011, the British publication The Beauty Magazine named her "England's Best-dressed Personality" and the "Most Elegant Woman in the World". She was named the "Most Beautiful Woman of the Year" by The Beauty Magazine in 2011 and 2012. In January 2012, the Headwear Association voted her "Headwear Person of the Year". She was number one on Vanity Fairs annual best dressed lists in 2010, 2011, 2012 and 2013; she also appeared as the cover star in 2012. In 2011, 2012 and 2013, she was listed as one of Time magazine's 100 Most Influential People in the World. In 2014, she was lauded as a British cultural icon, with young adults from abroad naming her among a group of people who they most associated with UK culture. The then Duchess was named in the International Best Dressed Hall of Fame List in the same year.

In June 2016, she took part in her first magazine shoot for British Vogue's centenary issue, appearing on the cover. The shoot took place on the Sandringham Estate; Catherine was involved in selecting her wardrobe of "off-duty jeans and shirts" reflecting her love of the countryside. The spread was dubbed as the "most personal and natural royal portraits ever undertaken by Vogue". The photoshoot was done in collaboration with her patronage, the National Portrait Gallery, where two pictures from the shoot were displayed. In 2018, Tatler named her on its list of Britain's best dressed people, praising her for "recycling her looks, rather than wearing them as one-offs", as well as her use of "both high street and high-end brands". She topped Tatlers Best Dressed List in 2022.

The "Kate Middleton effect" is the trend that the Princess is reported to have had in sales of particular products and brands. In 2018, Brand Finance's research cited Catherine as the "Most Powerful Royal Fashion Influencer", retaining that pieces in her wardrobe increase desirability among 38 percent of American shoppers. The Princess has been credited for popularizing nude pumps and hosiery in the early years of her marriage. During daytime engagements, she has been noted to favor coatdresses, tea dresses, waxed jackets, lavallière blouses, blazers, and skinny jeans. While Catherine wears items from many new designers, she has also worn dresses by Catherine Walker, who designed many of Diana's favourite evening gowns and day suits. She has worn outfits, hats and ensembles by many other fashion designers. The brands she favours are noted in the media. Catherine has worn Jenny Packham numerous times, most notably outside the Lindo Wing after giving birth to each of her children in 2013, 2015, and 2018 respectively, and at the No Time to Die premiere in London when she appeared in a dress inspired by Shirley Eaton's character in Goldfinger. Alexander McQueen has been referred to as Catherine's "go-to" brand since her wedding in 2011, and she has worn designs to several annual events including Trooping the Colour, Royal Ascot and the British Academy Film Awards, as well as state banquets and receptions. She has worn several high-street brands during official engagements and projects, most frequently Topshop and Zara. Believed to be influenced by the style and fashion choices of Diana, Princess of Wales, Catherine has developed a "caring wardrobe" similar to that of her mother-in-law, with colourful fabrics, skirt suits, and bright hues suitable for visiting hospitals and schools.

Catherine, who attended the 71st British Academy Film Awards, did not participate in Time's Up movement calling for women to wear black on the red carpet. Royal protocol forbids members of the royal family from taking part in political movements but she wore a black sash and carried a black handbag as a variation to the informal black dress code. In March 2018, together with the then-Countess of Wessex, she hosted the Commonwealth Fashion Exchange reception at Buckingham Palace during 2018 London Fashion Week. In 2021, it was reported that Catherine boosted the British fashion industry up to £1 billion within a year. She was also chosen as one of the 25 most influential women in the United Kingdom by British Vogue in August 2021.

Speaking to The Times for her 40th birthday, her aides stated that Catherine does not accept "advice on a PR basis" and will "never do something because she thinks the media will like it." Jamie Lowther-Pinkerton, Catherine and William's former private secretary, stated that "she has that almost old-fashioned, Queen Mother attitude to drama – she just doesn't do it." In December 2022, Catherine was found to be the second most liked member of the royal family by statistics and polling company YouGov, following her husband. In March 2023, The Independent included her in its "Influence List 2023".

Privacy and the media
The death of Diana, Princess of Wales, in Paris while being chased by paparazzi in 1997, influenced her son's attitude towards the media. William and Catherine have asked that, when off-duty, their privacy should be respected.

After her graduation from university, Middleton was faced with widespread press attention and was often photographed by the paparazzi. On 17 October 2005, she complained through her lawyer about harassment from the media, stating she had done nothing significant to warrant publicity and complained that photographers were permanently stationed outside her flat. Former royal press secretary Dickie Arbiter stated that her treatment by the press drew parallels to the tumultuous experience of William's mother in the early years of her marriage. From 2005 to 2006, Middleton's phone was hacked 155 times according to former News of the World royal editor Clive Goodman, who was involved in a phone hacking scandal by the newspaper that targeted the royal family. In 2005 and after Middleton was chased by the paparazzi on her way to an interview, William consulted her and her father and penned a legal letter to newspapers requesting that they respect her privacy. In April 2006, her lawyers issued new warnings to the Daily Mail, the Daily Star and The Sun and the picture agencies Big Pictures and Matrix after they published photographs of Middleton on a bus during a shopping trip.

Media attention increased around the time of her 25th birthday in January 2007, where twenty photographers and five television crews photographed her leaving for work. Warnings were issued by Prince Charles, William, and Middleton's lawyers, who threatened legal action. Two newspaper groups, News International, which publishes The Times and The Sun; and the Guardian Media Group, publishers of The Guardian, decided to refrain from publishing paparazzi pictures of her, but continued to use photographs of Middleton at public events. In March 2007, her lawyers filed a formal complaint to the Press Complaints Commission (PCC) over a photograph published on the Daily Mirror that was taken as a result of harassment. In April 2007, Middleton reached a settlement with the Daily Mirror, which was followed by a warning by the PCC over press treatment of Middleton. In July 2007, MPs on the Culture, Media and Sport Select Committee stated in a report on press regulation that Middleton was the victim of "clear and persistent harassment" by the paparazzi and criticised the lack of intervention by the PCC, who circulated a letter from Middleton's solicitors on the issue of press harassment but said they were not directly asked by her lawyers to act.

In 2010, Middleton pursued an invasion of privacy claim against two agencies and photographer Niraj Tanna, who took photographs of her playing tennis over Christmas 2009 while on holiday in Cornwall. Middleton was awarded £5,000 damages, legal costs, and an apology from the photographic press agency Rex Features Ltd. She announced that the money would be donated to charity. In 2011, close associates of Jonathan Rees, a private investigator connected to the News International phone hacking scandal, stated that he had targeted Catherine during her period as William's girlfriend.

In May 2011, the Middleton family complained to the Press Complaints Commission after photographs of Catherine, her sister, and their mother in bikinis while on holiday in 2006 on board a yacht off Ibiza were published in the Mail on Sunday, Daily Mail, News of the World, and Daily Mirror. One of the photographs showed Catherine's sister topless, which prompted the family to complain about newspapers breaching the editors' code of practice by invading their privacy. In September 2011, Daily Mail, the Mail on Sunday, and Daily Mirror all agreed to have the images removed from their website and never publish them again following a deal negotiated by the Press Complaints Commission.

In September 2012, the French edition of Closer and the Italian gossip magazine Chi, published photographs of Catherine sun-bathing topless while on holiday at the Château d'Autet (a private château on a 260-ha estate 71 km north of Aix-en-Provence). Analysts from The Times believed the photographs were taken from the D22 (Vaucluse) road half a kilometre from the pool—a distance that would require an 800-mm or a 1000-mm lens. On 17 September 2012, William and Catherine filed a criminal complaint with the French prosecution department and launched a claim for civil damages at the Tribunal de Grande Instance de Nanterre. The following day the courts granted an injunction against Closer, prohibiting further publication of the photographs and announced a criminal investigation would be initiated. Under French law, punitive damages cannot be awarded but intrusions of privacy are a criminal offence carrying a maximum jail sentence of one year and a fine of up to €45,000 for individuals and €225,000 for companies. In September 2017, Closer was fined €100,000 and its editor Laurence Pieau and owner Ernesto Mauri were each fined €45,000.
 
In December 2012, two Australian radio hosts, Michael Christian and Mel Greig, called King Edward VII's Hospital where Catherine was an in-patient for hyperemesis gravidarum. Pretending to be the Queen and the Prince of Wales, Greig and Christian spoke to a nurse on Catherine's ward, enquiring about her condition. Following a hospital inquiry and a public backlash against the hoax, Jacintha Saldanha, the nurse who put the call through to the ward, committed suicide. The radio hosts subsequently apologised for their actions.

In February 2013, Chi published the first photos of Catherine's exposed baby bump, taken during her vacation on the private island of Mustique. The British press refused to publish the paparazzi shots. While Catherine was visiting the Blue Mountains in Sydney, a picture was taken of her bare bottom as her dress blew up. Many newspapers outside the UK published the picture. In October 2014, Catherine and William sent a legal letter to a freelance photographer who had put their son George and his nanny "under surveillance", asking the individual to stop "harassing and following" them. On 14 August 2015, Kensington Palace published a letter detailing what it stated were the "dangerous" and invasive efforts of the media to get paparazzi pictures of Prince George and Princess Charlotte. Jason Knauf, communications secretary to the Cambridges, wrote the letter to media standards organisations in various countries.

In March 2019, the royal family introduced new rules for followers commenting its official social media accounts in response to the online abuse aimed at Catherine and her sister-in-law Meghan.

In May 2020, Kensington Palace said that the cover story of Tatler magazine titled 'Catherine the Great' contained "a swathe of inaccuracies and false misrepresentations". Despite the palace's statement that most of the material was not given to them before publication, the magazine's editor-in-chief announced that he would stand behind the story as the palace had been aware of it for months. In September 2020, after pressure from the couple's lawyers, the magazine removed remarks on Catherine's family and other similar claims from the online version of the story.

Titles, styles, honours, and arms

Titles and styles 

Upon her marriage in 2011, Catherine gained the style Royal Highness and the titles Duchess of Cambridge, Countess of Strathearn, and Baroness Carrickfergus. She was normally known as "Her Royal Highness The Duchess of Cambridge" except in Scotland, where she was instead called "Her Royal Highness The Countess of Strathearn".

On her father-in-law's accession to the throne on 8 September 2022, Catherine also became Duchess of Cornwall and Duchess of Rothesay. She was thus briefly called "Her Royal Highness The Duchess of Cornwall and Cambridge".
On 9 September 2022, the King announced the appointment of William as Prince of Wales, with Catherine becoming Princess of Wales. She has since been known as "Her Royal Highness The Princess of Wales", and as "Her Royal Highness The Duchess of Rothesay" in Scotland. She is also Countess of Chester.

Honours
Catherine is a Dame Grand Cross of the Royal Victorian Order, and a recipient of the Royal Family Order of Queen Elizabeth II.

Arms

Ancestry

The Princess of Wales's father is Michael Middleton, son of Captain Peter Middleton, who, along with their forebears, were from Leeds, Yorkshire. Robert Lacey describes Michael  Middleton's family  as having aristocratic ancestry with  Baroness Airedale (1868–1942) being his   distant ancestor. Catherine's paternal great-grandmother Olive Middleton (née Lupton) and her cousin Baroness von Schunck (née Kate Lupton) were members of the Lupton family who are described as landed gentry and as such, were invited to the coronation of King George V and Queen Mary in 1911. Four successive generations of Catherine's ancestors had lived at Potternewton Hall Estate, the family seat, including Catherine's great-grandmother Olive Middleton, her father, politician Francis Martineau Lupton, his mother, educator Frances Lupton and her father, epidemiologist and surgeon Thomas Michael Greenhow.

Catherine's maternal ancestors, the Harrisons, were working-class labourers and miners from Sunderland and County Durham. Ancestors through her maternal line include Sir Thomas Conyers, 9th Baronet (1731–1810), who was a descendant of King Edward IV through his illegitimate daughter Elizabeth Plantagenet. Other paternal ancestors are Sir Thomas Fairfax (1475–1520) and his wife Anne Gascoigne, who was a descendant of King Edward III.

Bibliography

Books
 HRH The Duchess of Cambridge, "Foreword", in: 
 HRH The Duchess of Cambridge, "Foreword", in: 
 HRH The Duchess of Cambridge, "Foreword", in:

Authored articles and letters

Notes

References

Further reading

External links

 The Princess of Wales at the official website of the British royal family
 The Princess of Wales at the website of the Government of Canada
 
 

|-

 
1982 births
Living people
20th-century British people
21st-century British people
20th-century British women
21st-century British women
Alumni of the University of St Andrews
Carrickfergus
Strathearn
Dames Grand Cross of the Royal Victorian Order
Duchesses of Cambridge
Duchesses of Cornwall
Duchesses of Rothesay
English Anglicans
Family of Charles III
HuffPost bloggers
House of Windsor
Mental health activists
Middleton family (British)
Mountbatten-Windsor family
People educated at Downe House School
People educated at Marlborough College
People educated at St Andrew's School, Pangbourne
People from Bucklebury
People from Reading, Berkshire
Princesses of Wales
Wives of British princes